A – B – C – D – E – F – G – H – I – J – K – L – M – N – O – P – Q – R – S – T – U – V – W – XYZ

This is a list of rivers in the United States that have names starting with the letter P.  For the main page, which includes links to listings by state, see List of rivers in the United States.

Pa 
Pack River – Idaho
Pacolet River – South Carolina
Pahsimeroi River – Idaho
Paint Creek, Scioto tributary – Ohio
Paint Creek stream – Ohio
Paint Rock River – Alabama
Pajaro River – California
Palmer River – Massachusetts, Rhode Island
Palouse River – Idaho, Washington
Paluxy River – Texas
Pamet River – Massachusetts
Pamlico River – North Carolina
Pamunkey River – Virginia
Panther Creek – Illinois
Paria River – Utah, Arizona
Park River – Connecticut
Partridge River – Minnesota
Pasayten River – Washington
Pascagoula River – Mississippi
Pascoag River – Rhode Island
Paskamanset River – Massachusetts
Pasquotank River – North Carolina
Passagassawakeag River – Maine
Passaic River – New Jersey
Passumpsic River – Vermont
Patapsco River – Maryland
Patoka River – Indiana
Patterson Creek – West Virginia
Patuxent River – Maryland
Paulins Kill – New Jersey
Paw Paw River – Michigan
Pawcatuck River – Rhode Island, Connecticut
Pawtuckaway River – New Hampshire
Pawtuxet River – Rhode Island
Payette River – Idaho

Pe – Ph 
Pea River – Alabama
Peabody River – New Hampshire
Peace River – Florida
Pearl River – Mississippi, Louisiana
Pecatonica River – Wisconsin, Illinois
Peckman River – New Jersey
Peconic River – New York
Pecos River – New Mexico, Texas
Pedernales River – Texas
Pedlar River – Virginia
Pee Dee River – North Carolina, South Carolina
Pembina River – North Dakota
Pemebonwon River – Wisconsin
Pemigewasset River – New Hampshire
Pend Oreille River – Idaho, Washington
Penns Creek – Pennsylvania
Penobscot River – Maine
Pensaukee River – Wisconsin
Pepper Creek – Delaware
Pequannock River – New Jersey
Pequea Creek – Pennsylvania
Pequest River – New Jersey
Pequonnock River – Connecticut
Perdido River – Alabama, Florida
Pere Marquette River – Michigan
Perkiomen Creek – Pennsylvania
Perquimans River – North Carolina
Perry Stream – New Hampshire
Peshtigo River – Wisconsin
Petaluma River – California
Peters Creek – Pennsylvania
Peters River – Massachusetts, Rhode Island
Pettaquamscutt River – Rhode Island
Phillips Brook – New Hampshire

Pi – Pl 
Pigeon Creek – Indiana
Pigeon River – Michigan
Pigeon River – Minnesota
Pigeon River – North Carolina, Tennessee
Pigeon River – Wisconsin
Pigg River – Virginia
Pike River – Wisconsin (tributary of Lake Michigan)
Pike River – Wisconsin (tributary of Menominee River)
Pilchuck River – Washington
Pinconning River – Michigan
Pine Creek – Pennsylvania
Pine River – Michigan
Pine River – Minnesota
Pine River – New Hampshire
Pine River – Rhode Island
Pine River – Wisconsin (tributary of Wisconsin River)
Pine River – Wisconsin (tributary of Wolf River)
Piney River – eastern Tennessee
Piney River – central Tennessee
Pinnacle Creek – West Virginia
Pinnebog River – Michigan
Pipers Creek – Washington
Pipestem River – North Dakota
Piru Creek – California
Piscassic River – New Hampshire
Piscataqua River – New Hampshire, Maine
Piscataquis River – Maine
Piscataquog River – New Hampshire
Pit River – California
Pithlachascotee River – Florida
Pitmegea River – Alaska
Plateau Creek – Colorado
Platte River – Michigan
Platte River – Minnesota
Platte River – Iowa, Missouri
Platte River – Nebraska
Platte River – Wisconsin
Pleasant River – Maine
Plover River – Wisconsin
Plum River – Illinois

Po 
Po River – Virginia
Pocasset River – Massachusetts
Pocasset River – Rhode Island
Pocatalico River – West Virginia
Pocomoke River – Delaware, Maryland
Pohatcong Creek – New Jersey
Pohopoco Creek – Pennsylvania
Point Pleasant Creek – West Virginia
Pokegama River – Wisconsin
Pomme de Terre River – Minnesota
Pomme de Terre River – Missouri
Pompton River – New Jersey
Ponaganset River – Rhode Island
Pond Creek – West Virginia
Pond River – Kentucky
Poni River – Virginia
Poplar River – Montana
Poplar River – Wisconsin
Popple River – Wisconsin
Porcupine River – Alaska
Port Tobacco River – Maryland
Portage River – Michigan
Portage River – Ohio
Portneuf River – Idaho
Potato River – Wisconsin
Poteau River – Arkansas, Oklahoma
Potomac River – District of Columbia, Maryland, West Virginia, Virginia
Potowomut River – Rhode Island
Powder River – Montana, Wyoming
Powder River – Oregon
Powell River – Virginia, Tennessee
Powwow River – New Hampshire, Massachusetts

Pr – Pu 
Prairie River – Wisconsin
Prairie Dog Town Fork Red River – Texas, Oklahoma
Presque Isle River – Michigan
Presumpscot River – Maine
Price River – Utah
Priest River – Idaho
Providence River – Rhode Island
Provo River – Utah
Pudding River – Oregon
Pungo River – North Carolina
Purgatoire River – Colorado
Putah Creek – California
Puyallup River – Washington

P